Orzechowo  is a village in the administrative district of Gmina Olsztynek, within Olsztyn County, Warmian-Masurian Voivodeship, in northern Poland.

The village has a population of 154 people.

Village is known for its neogothic church which is still active despite severe depopulation.

References

Orzechowo